MS  GNV Cristal is a cruiseferry owned by the Italy-based SNAV and operated by their Grandi Navi Veloci brand. She was built in 1989 by Schichau Seebeckwerft in Bremerhaven, West Germany as MS Olau Hollandia for Olau Line. From 1994 to 2005 she sailed as MS Pride of Le Havre for P&O ferries. From 2005 to 2017 she operated as the SNAV Sardegna between Civitavecchia, Palermo and Olbia.

Concept and construction

Olau Line had been owned by the Germany-based TT-Line since 1979. Under TT-Line ownership, Olau Line had acquired two purpose-built ferries from AG Weser Seebeckwerft, Olau Hollandia and Olau Britannia for their Sheerness—Vlissingen service. During the mid-80s TT-Line acquired MS Peter Pan (1986) and MS Nils Holgersson (1986), enlarged versions of Olau Hollandia and Olau Britannia design also from AG Weser Seebeckwerft, for their Trelleborg—Travemünde service. During the latter half of the decade, TT-line decided to order two more ships of the Peter Pan-type, again from AG Weser Seebeckwerft in Bremerhaven, West Germany as replacements for the two Olau ships. During the build the shipyard merged with Schichau Unterweser to become Schichau Seebeckwerft. The first of these ships was delivered in 1989 as the second Olau Hollandia, replacing her older namesake.

Service history

1989–1994: Olau Hollandia

The second Olau Hollandia was delivered to TT-Line on 29 September 1989, and five days later she entered service on Olau Line's service between Sheerness and Vlissingen. On entering service she replaced the first . The Olau Hollandias sister, followed a year later. In practice the new Olau Hollandia and Olau Britannia proved to be too extravagant for the service, and TT-Line was forced to look into cost-cutting measures to keep the ships running. On 6 January 1993 the Olau Hollandia was re-registered to Luxembourg, but after a series of strikes and other protests in part of the German seamen's trade union, TT-Line were forced to return the ship into German registry on 3 February 1993. Subsequently, TT-Line drew up plans for swapping the Olau ships with the ships in Trelleborg—Travemünde service, and moving the resulting new Olau ships into Bahamian registry. Another strike on board the Olau ships followed, and in May 1994 TT-Line decided to close down the Olau Line brand entirely, with the Olau Hollandia and Britannia chartered to P&O Ferries. The Olau Hollandia made her last sailing for Olau Line on 15 May 1994.

1994–2005: Pride of Le Havre

On 6 May 1994 the Olau Hollandia was named Pride of Le Havre and re-registered to the United Kingdom, replacing an earlier Pride of Le Havre that was in turn renamed Pride of Cherbourg. Although planned for the Portsmouth—Le Havre route, she entered service on the Portsmouth—Cherbourg route The Pride of Le Havre only did one sailing to Cherbourg when she took Veterans across to celebrate the 50th Anniversary of D Day.ref. Capt.M Edward. 

While outbound from Le Havre on the evening 27 July 1998, the Pride of Le Havre suffered a switchboard explosion in the engine room, resulting in a fire in the engine room and loss of electrical power throughout the ship. Three members of the crew were seriously injured in the explosion. After the fire had been extinguished and power restored, the ship returned to Le Havre with the assistance of two tugs. The injured crewmen were transported to a local hospital, where the most seriously injured crewman died five days later. After unloading the injured crewmen the Pride of Le Havre sailed to Portsmouth, where she arrived early the next morning. In Portsmouth all passengers and cargo were unloaded and the ship itself was subsequently repaired. On 18 March 1999 the ship suffered another engine room fire. This time repairs were carried out in Southampton, and the ship was back in service on 24 March 1999.

On 28 September 2004 plans to charter the Pride of Le Havre and her sister Pride of Portsmouth to Brittany Ferries were made public. The plans came under scrutiny of the relevant competition regulators, and as a result Brittany Ferries decided not to charter the ships. They remained in P&O Ferries service until 30 September 2005, when they were withdrawn from service and subsequently laid up on the River Fal.

2006–2017: SNAV Sardegna

In November 2005 TT-Line sold the Pride of Le Havre and Pride of Portsmouth to the Italy-based SNAV. On 30 December 2005 the Pride of Le Havre was renamed SNAV Sardegna, but she retained United Kingdom flag for the time being. On 5 January 2006 the SNAV Sardegna left Falmouth for Naples. On 27 March 2006 she was re-registered in Italy, and in May of the same year she entered service on SNAV's routes from Civitavecchia to Palermo and Olbia.

2017–Present: GNV Cristal

SNAV Sardegna was renamed GNV Cristal on February 24, 2017.  Grandi Navi Veloci and SNAV are both subsidiaries of MSC Group and merged in 2010.

Sister ships

The Olau Britannia was the third of four sisters in the Peter Pan class, the others being:

MS Peter Pan (1986) was the first of the sisters built by AG Weser Seebeckwerft, Bremerhaven, Germany for TT-Line. She was sold in 1990 to TT-line (Tasmania) and in 1993 renamed as the first Spirit of Tasmania. She was sold in 2002 to Nordsjøferger and chartered in 2003 to Fjord Line as MS Fjord Norway. In 2006 she was sold to DFDS Seaways to serve the IJmuiden (Netherlands)–Newcastle (Britain) route as MS Princess of Norway. In 2011 she was renamed MS Princess Seaways.

 was the second of the sisters built by AG Weser Seebeckwerft, Bremerhaven, Germany for TT-Line. She was sold to Brittany Ferries in 1993 and renamed MS Val de Loire. In late 2005 she was sold to DFDS Seaways to serve the IJmuiden (Netherlands)–Newcastle (Britain) route as MS King of Scandinavia, subsequently renamed in 2011 as MS King Seaways.

MS Olau Britannia (1990) was the fourth of the vessels and built by Schichau Unterweser, Bremerhaven, Germany for TT-Line's sister company Olau Line to a slightly modified design. With her Olau sister the  she was chartered in 1994 to P&O Ferries and renamed MS Pride of Portsmouth. In 2005 she stopped operating for P&O and was subsequently sold to SNAV in Italy and renamed MS SNAV Lazio.

References

Notes

Bibliography

External links

 Official website of the GNV fleet

Cruiseferries
Ferries of the United Kingdom
Ferries of France
Ferries of Italy
Ships built in Bremen (state)
1989 ships

it:Classe Peter Pan